Mount Allsup is a rock peak, 2,580 m, marking the southwest limits of the Canopy Cliffs, at the south end of Queen Elizabeth Range. Named by Advisory Committee on Antarctic Names (US-ACAN) for Clifford C. Allsup, Aviation Machinist's Mate, U.S. Navy, who was injured during Operation Deep Freeze II, 1956–57.

Mountains of Oates Land